Furqat is a district of Fergana Region in Uzbekistan. The capital lies at the town Navbahor. The district consists of 8 urban-type settlements (Navbahor, Kaldoʻshan, Qoʻqonboy, Tomosha, Chek chuvaldak, Shoyinbek, Eski, Eshon) and 6 rural communities.

References

Districts of Uzbekistan
Fergana Region